Southern Counties Hockey Association runs field hockey leagues based in the South and South East of England. The leagues feed teams into the Men's and Women's England Hockey Leagues and receive teams from sub-regional (county) leagues.

League Structure 
The male league is the South Hockey League and female is the South Clubs' Women's Hockey League. The men's system consists of a Premier Division 1, a Premier Division 2, followed by regional and county divisions.
The women's system consists of a Division 1, followed by subsequent lower divisions and county divisions. The Southern Counties Hockey Association covers eight counties. 

Berkshire
Buckinghamshire
Hampshire
Kent
Middlesex
Oxfordshire
Surrey
Sussex

Recent champions

South Hockey League Premier Division 1

South Clubs' Women's Hockey League Division 1

References

Field hockey governing bodies in England
Field hockey leagues in England
Sport in Berkshire
Sport in Buckinghamshire
Sport in Hampshire
Sport in Kent
Field hockey in London
Sport in Oxfordshire
Sport in Surrey
Sport in Sussex